Jamie Lovell Watson (born February 23, 1972) is an American former professional basketball player who played in the National Basketball Association (NBA) and other leagues.

Watson, a 6' 7" 190 lb small forward, was selected 47th overall (second round) by the Utah Jazz in the 1994 NBA draft. Between 1994 and 1997 he played with the Jazz and briefly for the Dallas Mavericks, as well as three games for the Miami Heat in 1999.

He finished in third place during the NBA Slam Dunk Contest in 1995.

References

External links
College & NBA stats @ basketballreference.com
Jamie Watson headshot

1972 births
Living people
21st-century African-American sportspeople
African-American basketball players
American expatriate basketball people in Chile
American expatriate basketball people in Colombia
American expatriate basketball people in Cyprus
American expatriate basketball people in Italy
American expatriate basketball people in Jordan
American expatriate basketball people in Lebanon
American expatriate basketball people in the Philippines
American expatriate basketball people in Portugal
American men's basketball players
Basketball players from North Carolina
Dallas Mavericks players
Mens Sana Basket players
Miami Heat players
Parade High School All-Americans (boys' basketball)
People from Elm City, North Carolina
Philippine Basketball Association imports
Pop Cola Panthers players
Shooting guards
S.L. Benfica basketball players
Small forwards
South Carolina Gamecocks men's basketball players
Utah Jazz draft picks
Utah Jazz players
20th-century African-American sportspeople